Hastings is a surname of English and Irish origin, and is used also as a given name.

Surnames
As a surname Hastings may sometimes be a patronymic surname from the Anglo-Norman personal name Hasting (also Hastain), but is usually a toponymic surname from Hastings in Sussex.

Separately also a common surname in Connacht Ireland, where it is thought to often be a rough phonetic Anglicization of the Irish Gaelic sept of Ó hOistín who were followers of the MacDermots of Moylurg, first Anglicized as Hestin and Histon, then later Hastings.

John O'Hart in his work "The origin and stem of the Irish nation" published 1892, states the Irish Hastings origin is from the ancient Irish Gaelic name O'h-Uisgin, other possible Irish sources may derive from a Norse Gaelic personal name Oistín or a phonetic version of Ó hOissín another old Connacht Irish surname, a family name that can sound regionally similar when said in original Irish. This family are most prominent in County Mayo, County Limerick, County Kerry and County Clare.

List of people surnamed Hastings
 Alan Hastings, American theoretical ecologist
 Alcee Hastings (1936–2021), US congressman from Florida
 Amy-Joyce Hastings Irish actress
 Anne Hastings (disambiguation), several people
 Barbara Huddleston Abney-Hastings, 13th Countess of Loudoun (1919–2002)
 Barbara Rawdon-Hastings, Marchioness of Hastings (1810–1858), fossil collector and geologist
 Basil Macdonald Hastings (1881–1928), British author, playwright and journalist, father of Macdonald Hastings, grandfather of Max Hastings
 Bill Hastings (censor) (born c. 1960), Chief Censor of New Zealand from 1999 to 2010
 Bill Hastings (footballer) (born 1888), English professional footballer
 Bob Hastings (1925–2014), American actor
 Brian Hastings (born 1940), New Zealand cricketer
 Brian Hastings (poker player) (born 1988), American poker player
 Charles Hastings (disambiguation), several people
 Clare Hastings, British author, fashion journalist, stylist and costume designer
 Clifford C. Hastings (1882–1946), New York politician
 Cuyler Hastings (c. 1864–1914), American stage actor, played Sherlock Holmes
 Daniel Hastings (disambiguation), several people
 Doc Hastings (born 1941), US congressman from Washington State
 Don Hastings (born 1934), American actor
 Edith Abney-Hastings, 12th Countess of Loudoun (1883–1960)
 Edith Rawdon-Hastings, 10th Countess of Loudoun (1833–1874)
 Edward Hastings (disambiguation), several people
 Edwin George Hastings (1872–1953), American agricultural bacteriologist
 Elizabeth Hastings (disambiguation), several people
 Ernest Hastings (1879–1940), English entertainer
 Ferdinando Hastings, 6th Earl of Huntingdon (1609–1656)
 Lady Flora Hastings (1806–1839)
 Francis Hastings (disambiguation), several people
 Frank Abney Hastings (1794–1828)
 Fred W. Hastings, American politician
 Gavin Hastings (born 1962), Scottish rugby player
 George Hastings (disambiguation), several people
 Hans Francis Hastings, 12th Earl of Huntingdon (1779–1828), British navy officer
 Henry Hastings (disambiguation), several people
 James Hastings (1852–1922), Scottish theologian
 James F. Hastings (1926–2014), US congressman from New York
 Jimmy Hastings (born 1938), British musician
 John Hastings (disambiguation), several people
 Jordan Hastings (born 1982), Canadian musician
 Katherine Hastings, American poet
 Katherine Hastings, Countess of Huntingdon (died 1620)
 Kevin Hastings (born 1957), Australian rugby league footballer
 Lansford Hastings (1819–1870)
 Laurence Hastings, 1st Earl of Pembroke (1319–1348)
 Macdonald Hastings (1909–1982), British journalist
 Sir Max Hastings (born 1945), British journalist
 Meredith G. Hastings, American atmospheric chemist
 Michael Hastings (disambiguation), several people
 Milo Hastings (1884–1957), American author and inventor
 Natasha Hastings (born 1986), American sprint athlete
 Sir Patrick Hastings (1880–1952), English barrister
 Paul P. Hastings (1872–1947), American railroad executive
 Reed Hastings (born 1960), founder of Netflix
 Richard Hastings (disambiguation), several people
 Scott Hastings (disambiguation), several people
 Selina Hastings, Countess of Huntingdon (1707–1791)
 Selina Hastings (born 1945), British biographer and journalist
 Serranus Clinton Hastings (1814–1893), US congressman from Iowa, Chief Judge of Iowa and California
 Seth Hastings (1762–1831), US congressman from Massachusetts
 Simon Abney-Hastings, 15th Earl of Loudoun (born 1974)
 Smith H. Hastings (1843–1905)  Union Col. and Medal of Honor winner, see List of American Civil War Medal of Honor recipients: G–L
 Somerville Hastings  (1878–1967)  English Surgeon, Socialist and Member of Parliament
 Sir Stephen Hastings (1921–2005), British MP
 Theophilus Hastings, 7th Earl of Huntingdon (1650–1701)
 Theophilus Hastings, 9th Earl of Huntingdon (1696–1746)
 Thomas Hastings (disambiguation), several people
 W. K. Hastings (1930–2016), Canadian statistician
 Warner Hastings, 15th Earl of Huntingdon (1868–1939)
 Warren Hastings (1732–1818), first Governor-General of India
 Warren E. Hastings (1887-1970), American politician and locomotive engineer
 Will Hastings (born 1996), American football player
 William Hastings (disambiguation), several people

Fictional
Arthur Hastings, a character in Agatha Christie novels
Shaun Hastings, a character in the Assassin's Creed video game series.
Spencer Hastings, main character in the ABC Family television series Pretty Little Liars and in the novel of the same name.
Ted Hastings, the Superintendent in charge of AC-12 in the BBC's Line of Duty

People with the given name Hastings
 Hastings Ismay, 1st Baron Ismay (1887–1965), first Secretary General of NATO
 Hastings Banda (1898–1997), prime minister and president of Malawi
 Hastings Edward Harrington (1832–1861), English recipient of the Victoria Cross
 Hastings Keith (1915–2005), US congressman from Massachusetts
 Hastings Lees-Smith (1878–1941),  English Member of Parliament
 Hastings Rashdall (1858–1924), English philosopher
 Hastings Russell, 12th Duke of Bedford (1888–1953)
 Sir Hastings Yelverton (1808–1878), British admiral

See also
 Baron Hastings
 Hastings was the surname of some of the D'Oyly baronets
 Hastings was the surname of the Earl of Huntingdon
 Abney-Hastings

References 

English-language surnames
English given names
Anglicised Irish-language surnames
English toponymic surnames

de:Hastings (Begriffsklärung)
fr:Hastings
it:Hastings
nl:Hastings
ja:ヘイスティングズ
pt:Hastings (desambiguação)
sv:Hastings